Zabuzan is a rural locality (a selo) and the administrative center of Zabuzansky Selsoviet, Krasnoyarsky District, Astrakhan Oblast, Russia. The population was 1,614 as of 2010. There are 27 streets.

Geography 
It is located on the Buzan River, 8 km southwest of Krasny Yar (the district's administrative centre) by road. Solnechny is the nearest rural locality.

References 

Rural localities in Krasnoyarsky District, Astrakhan Oblast